Bijarabin or Bijar Bin may refer to:
 Bijarabin, Astara
 Bijar Bin, Talesh